Marko Grilc (7 July 1983 – 23 November 2021) was a Slovenian professional snowboarder and social media personality. He died in a snowboarding accident while exploring the terrain at the Austrian ski resort of Sölden with a filming team. Some media outlets initially reported that he died of a head injury while not wearing a helmet. However, his brother Luka Grilc later announced via Instagram that Marko fell and hit his chest on a rock, which resulted in a punctured aorta and an instant death.

References

1983 births
2021 deaths
Slovenian male snowboarders
Sport deaths in Austria
Sportspeople from Ljubljana
Deaths from head injury